WOCO may refer to:

 WOCO (AM), a radio station (1260 AM) licensed to Oconto, Wisconsin, United States
 WOCO-FM, a radio station (107.1 FM) licensed to Oconto, Wisconsin, United States
 UEFA Women's Championship, football competition contested by the senior women's national teams of the members of UEFA